Deshbandhu College for Girls is a women's college located in Kolkata. It was established in 1955 with the affiliation of the University of Calcutta.

Academics
The college offers B.A./B.Sc./B.Com. (3 years degree Course) degrees in Bengali, English, Geography, History, Economics, Philosophy, Sanskrit and Education Accountancy. The college has introduced BBA program from the session 2003–2004.

See also 
List of colleges affiliated to the University of Calcutta
Education in India
Education in West Bengal

References

External links
www.deshbandhucollegeforgirls.com

University of Calcutta affiliates
Educational institutions established in 1955
Women's universities and colleges in West Bengal
1955 establishments in West Bengal